Scea auriflamma is a moth of the family Notodontidae first described by Carl Geyer in 1827. It is found in[South America, including and possibly limited to Brazil.

Larvae have been recorded on Passiflora species.

References

Species page at Tree of Life Web Project

Notodontidae of South America
Moths described in 1827